Al-Habaj is a sub-district located in Az Zahir District, Al Bayda Governorate, Yemen.  Al-Habaj had a population of 2746 according to the 2004 census.

References 

Sub-districts in Az Zahir District